Laughing All the While is the second studio album by Echo Orbiter.  It was released on Looking Glass Workshop in 2000.  Receiving positive reviews, the album has been described as chaotic and orchestral brand of pop reflecting the band's growing creative confidence, and "a wondrous, melody-packed celebration of unfettered creativity."  The band has described the process and product as L'art pour l'art in the style of Aestheticism and the Decadent Movement.  Following a litany of production and logistical difficulties with creating and releasing the album, along with its lyrical themes, the album was viewed as a reflection of the ills of insanity.

Track listing

Credits
Justin Emerle - guitar, vocals, keyboards, percussion
Colin Emerle - bass guitar, keyboards, vocals, percussion
Jeremiah Steffan - drums, percussion, vocals
Brian Michael - keyboards, vocals

References

External links
Laughing All The While

2000 albums
Echo Orbiter albums